The 2007–08 season in Hong Kong football, starting July 2007 and ending June 2008:

Overview
 Hong Kong 08 was dissolved as Hong Kong was knocked out from the 2008 Summer Olympics qualification.
 Tung Po, the 2006-07 Second Division champion refused to promote while the runner-up Shek Kip Mei promoted and renamed to Workable.
 Eastern was to be relegated from Second Division to Third 'A' Division by rule but was subsequently invited to promote to First Division after obtaining sufficient sponsorship

Events

Representative team

Hong Kong team
Hong Kong have gone through their 2010 FIFA World Cup qualifying campaign, where they were knocked out in the Second Round.

Hong Kong national under-23 football team
Hong Kong national under-23 football team this season is preparing for the 2009 East Asian Games to be hosted in Hong Kong.

1 Hong Kong's score comes first.

Honours

Asian clubs competitions

AFC Cup 2007

Happy Valley - group stage
Xiangxue Sun Hei / Convoy Sun Hei - quarter-final

AFC Cup 2008

Kitchee - group stage
South China - group stage

Hong Kong Top Footballer Awards

Hong Kong Top Footballer
  Li Haiqiang (South China)

Fans' Player of the Year
  Lee Chi Ho (South China)

Hong Kong Footballer Awards (Best XI)

Best Youth Player
  Kwok Kin Pong (South China)
  Lo Chun Kit (Eastern)

Coach of the Year
  Liu Chun Fai (Citizen)

Exhibition Matches

Barclays Asia Trophy 2007

Mission Hills Cup

The Citizen Athletic Association 60th Anniversary Invitation Football Match
Citizen organized an exhibition competition on 22 August 2007 for celebrating the 60th Anniversary of the club. It featured two matches including the host Citizen against Guangdong, and another Hong Kong team South China versus J. League team Vissel Kobe.

 Citizen vs Guangdong

 South China vs Vissel Kobe

LA Galaxy HK Invitation Football Match

CASH 10th Anniversary Soccer Day
Pok Oi Hospital Charity Cup 

 CASH 10th Anniversary Cup

Transfer deals

References

External links

 
2007 in Hong Kong sport
2008 in Hong Kong sport